The 2012 FIA Formula 3 European Championship was the first edition of the FIA Formula 3 European Championship. It began at Hockenheim on 28 April, and finished on 21 October at the same venue after ten meetings, held jointly with the Formula 3 Euro Series and the British Formula Three Championship.

Prize tests
The top drivers in the final championship standings will be rewarded with a wide range of prize tests in various other racing categories. The top three drivers will receive a two-day test in a Formula Two car. As well as that, the champion will receive a Formula One test with Scuderia Ferrari, and the runner-up will receive a Deutsche Tourenwagen Masters test.

Drivers and teams
 Numbers used at Euro Series events listed; numbers used at races run to British Formula Three Championship regulations displayed in tooltips.

Race calendar and results
A ten-round calendar was announced on 15 March 2012; made up of seven rounds at Formula 3 Euro Series events, two British Formula 3 events at Pau and Spa-Francorchamps, with the Norisring round being run as a championship round in both series.

Notes

Championship standings
The second race at the Norisring was red-flagged after half the race had been completed due to torrential rain. As a result, series organisers only awarded half points to each of the classified finishers eligible to score points.

Notes

References

FIA European Championship
FIA Formula 3 European Championship
FIA Formula 3 European Championship
Formula 3